Doriprismatica kulonba is a species of sea slug, a dorid nudibranch, a shell-less marine gastropod mollusk in the family Chromodorididae. This species was found to belong in a clade with Doriprismatica atromarginata in a molecular phylogeny study.

Distribution 
This species is known only from southeastern Australian, Victoria and Northern Tasmania.

Description
Doriprismatica kulonba has a wide mantle overlap and very convoluted mantle margin. It is entirely white in colour apart from a thin band of milky yellow at the edge of the mantle and foot.

Ecology

References

Chromodorididae
Gastropods described in 1966